Fluorophosphoric acid is the inorganic compound with the formula H2PO3F.  It is a colorless viscous liquid that solidified to a glass upon cooling.

Preparation
Fluorophosphoric acid is produced commercially by treating phosphorus pentoxide with hydrogen fluoride. A less pure product can also be prepared by hydrolysis of phosphorus oxyfluoride, a reaction that first produces difluorophosphoric acid: 
POF3  +  H2O  →  HPO2F2  +  HF
The next steps give monofluorophosphoric acid:
HPO2F2  +  H2O  →  H2PO3F  +  HF

Reactions
Fluorophosphoric acid is a dibasic acid, with pKas of 5.5 and around 8.5. The conjugate bases are the monofluorophosphates, which are hydrolytically robust.

References

Oxohalides
Phosphorus halides
Fluoro complexes